Șoimeni may refer to several places in Romania:

 Șoimeni, a village in Vultureni Commune, Cluj County
 Șoimeni, a village in Păuleni-Ciuc Commune, Harghita County
 Șoimeni (river), a tributary of the Borșa in Cluj County

See also 
 Șoimuș (disambiguation)